is a railway station in the town of Noheji, Kamikita District, Aomori Prefecture, Japan, operated by  East Japan Railway Company (JR East).

Lines
Kita-Noheji Station is served by the Ōminato Line, and is located 2.8 kilometers from the terminus of the line at Noheji Station.

Station layout
Kita-Noheji Station has one ground-level side platform serving a single bidirectional track. There is no station building, but only a small rain shelter for passengers on the platform. The station is unattended.

History
The station was opened on December 20, 1958. With the privatization of the Japanese National Railways (JNR) on April 1, 1987, it came under the operational control of JR East.

Surrounding area

Wakaba Elementary School

See also
 List of Railway Stations in Japan

External links

Railway stations in Aomori Prefecture
Ōminato Line
Railway stations in Japan opened in 1958
Noheji, Aomori